The Braia is a right tributary of the river Jiul de Vest in Romania. It discharges into the Jiul de Vest in the city Lupeni.

References

Rivers of Romania
Rivers of Hunedoara County